Henriette Caillaux (5 December 1874 – 29 January 1943) was a Parisian socialite and second wife of the former Prime Minister of France, Joseph Caillaux. On March 16, 1914, she shot and killed Gaston Calmette, editor of the newspaper Le Figaro.

Early life and marriages
Henriette Caillaux was born Henriette Raynouard, at Rueil-Malmaison on 5 December 1874. At the age of 19, she married Léo Claretie, a writer twelve years her senior. They had two children. In 1907 she began an affair with Joseph Caillaux while both he and she were still married. In 1908, she divorced Claretie; Caillaux had more difficulties in divorcing his wife, but he eventually did so and they married in October 1911.

She claimed she found in her second marriage "the most complete happiness"; their joint assets were worth around 1.5 million francs, placing them among France's wealthiest couples and allowing them to live in what she described as "great comfort". The circumstances of the marriage, along with substantial public scrutiny by political enemies, however, opened up lines of attack against the couple in terms of moral corruption.

Shooting of Gaston Calmette

Background
While serving as Minister of Finance, Caillaux came under bitter attack from his political foes. The editor of the Le Figaro newspaper, Gaston Calmette, was a severe critic. Calmette received a letter belonging to Caillaux that journalistic etiquette at the time dictated should not be published. In the letter, Caillaux appeared to admit having orchestrated the rejection of a tax bill while publicly pretending to support it. Calmette published the letter at a time when Caillaux, in his capacity as Minister of Finance, was trying to get a progressive taxation law passed by the French Senate. The publication of his letter severely tarnished Caillaux's reputation and caused a great political upheaval.

The shooting
Henriette Caillaux believed that Calmette would publish other private letters that would demonstrate that Caillaux and she had had an intimate relationship while he was still married to his first wife. She felt the only way for her husband to defend his reputation would be to challenge Calmette to a duel, which, one way or another, would destroy her and her husband's life. Madame Caillaux made the decision to protect her beloved husband by sacrificing herself.

In the evening of 16 March 1914, Madame Caillaux entered the offices of Le Figaro wearing a large fur coat with her hands in a fur muff and asked to see Gaston Calmette. When told he was away but would return within an hour, she sat to wait. She was ushered into Calmette's office around 6 pm. Asking whether the editor knew why she had come, Calmette answered in the negative; immediately afterward, Henriette Caillaux fired six shots from a Browning automatic pistol into Calmette's abdomen, mortally wounding him.

Henriette Caillaux made no attempt to escape and newspaper workers in adjoining offices quickly apprehended her and summoned a doctor and the police. Demanding not to be touched, she attempted to defend herself, saying that "there is no longer any justice in France" but was told curtly to be quiet. She refused to be transported to the police headquarters in a police van, insisting on being driven there by her chauffeur in her own car, which was still parked outside. The police agreed to this and she was formally charged upon reaching the headquarters. Gaston Calmette died six hours after being shot.

Trial

After substantial publicity and a lengthy investigation, her trial opened at the Paris Cour d'assises on 20 July 1914, where it promptly dominated French news. The trial, which included a sexual scandal and a crime passionel by a society French lady, received twice as many column inches in Le Temps as the ongoing July Crisis, even as late as three days before the start of hostilities.

Because of the lax legal and procedural restraints in the cour d'assises, the conduct of the trial "seemed almost structured for drama [and] given a certain kind of case, it could produce a spectacle more compelling than anything the theatres could provide". At the time, opinion of the assassination divided on political grounds: the left believed Calmette's character assassination had driven Madam Caillaux into temporary insanity; the right believed her a cold-blooded killer who had acted to silence a critic at her husband's request.

It featured a deposition from the president of the Republic, an unheard-of occurrence at a criminal proceeding almost anywhere, along with the fact that many of the participants were among the most powerful members of French society. Heightening the drama, Henriette's husband threatened to cause a further scandal during the trial by releasing affidavits allegedly in his possession which showed that Poincaré was behind the press campaign against him.

If convicted, Madame Caillaux could be subject to life imprisonment at hard labour or death. Alternatively, if she could convince the jury of extenuating circumstances, she could be sentenced to five years of hard labour; or, as would emerge, if she could convince the jury of extremely extenuating circumstances, they could return a verdict of not guilty. To that end, she "portrayed herself as the victim of passions behind her control, as a woman rendered irresponsible by emotions more powerful than will itself" and attributed her actions to "uncontrollable impulses [which made] her lose control over her own actions". The defence, coupled with the emergence of sociological theories of criminology which attributed criminal action to environmental and unconscious factors and the traditional narrative of women ruled by their passions, helped her secure acquittal on 28 July 1914.

Later life
In the early 1930s she was awarded a diploma of the École du Louvre for her thesis on the sculptor Jules Dalou. She published a reference book in 1935 in which she established an inventory of the work of this artist. She died in 1943.

Legacy
[[File:The Caillaux Case.jpg|thumb|Advertisement for The Caillaux Case in Motion Picture World (1918)]]
In 1918, an American silent film, The Caillaux Case, was released by Fox Film. Directed by Richard Stanton, it featured Madlaine Traverse as Henriette Caillaux and Eugene Ormonde as Gaston Calmette. The film portrays both Henriette Caillaux and her husband as pro-German conspirators and traitors to France. Before and during World War I, Joseph Caillaux had indeed been an advocate of peaceful compromise with Germany, and at the end of 1917 while the war was still going on, he was charged and convicted of treason. The film was not a financial success.

In 1968 a German television film Madame Caillaux was made.

A 1985 made for French television film called L'Affaire Caillaux and a 1992 book titled Trial of Madame Caillaux by American history professor Edward Berenson recount the event.  In addition, Robert Delaunay used an illustration of the assassination as the basis for his 1914 painting Political Drama.

References

 Sources 
 
 
 

Further reading
 Kershaw, Alister. Murder in France. (London: Constable, 1955), 90-117.
 Shankland, Peter. Death of an Editor: The Caillaux Drama''. (London: William Kimber, 1981)

External links

1874 births
1943 deaths
French assassins
Feminism and history
People acquitted of murder
Burials at Père Lachaise Cemetery